Bernard R. Granville (July 4, 1888 - October 5, 1936) was an American actor, singer and minstrel show performer who was discovered by Florenz Ziegfeld and was known as "the twentieth century comedian".

Biography
He was born on July 4, 1888 in West Virginia, the only child of Algernon Granville and Cora B Chamberlain Granville (1864-1937).

He started his career as a minstrel show performer with Al G. Field at age 18, in 1906. He worked there until 1911. He worked as a circus clown for Ringling Brothers than went back to a minstrel show with Donnely and Hatfield

He performed in Marriage a la Carte at the La Salle Theater in Chicago, Illinois in 1911. He performed in A Winsome Widow at the Moulin Rouge in Manhattan, New York City. He then appeared in the Ziegfeld Follies of 1912, 1915, and 1916.

He served in World War I as a lieutenant and a pilot in France.

He married Rosina Timponi and they had a daughter Bonita Granville. They later divorced. He next married Eleanor Christie.

He died of pneumonia on October 5, 1936 in Hollywood, California.

Broadway
Whistling in the Dark (1932)
Castles in the Air (1927) as Monty Blair
Earl Carroll's Vanities (1923)
Frank Fay's Fables (1922)
Ziegfeld Follies of 1920
Morris Gest's Midnight Whirl (1919)
The Little Blue Devil (1919)
Ziegfeld Follies of 1916
Ziegfeld Follies of 1915
Dancing Around (1914)
The Passing Show of 1914
The Whirl of the World (1914)
Ziegfeld Follies of 1912

External links
Bernard R. Granville at Findagrave

References

1888 births
1936 deaths
Vaudeville performers
Blackface minstrel performers
American circus performers
Deaths from pneumonia in California
20th-century American singers
20th-century circus performers